Jerry Hairston may refer to

 Jerry Hairston Sr. (born 1952), retired Major League Baseball player
 Jerry Hairston Jr. (born 1976), former Major League Baseball player